Amelora is a genus of moths in the family Geometridae.

Species
 Amelora acontistica (Turner, 1947)
 Amelora adusta Turner, 1947
 Amelora amblopa Guest, 1887
 Amelora anepiscepta Turner, 1947
 Amelora arotraea Meyrick, 1892
 Amelora australis (Rosenstock, 1885)
 Amelora belemnophora Turner, 1947
 Amelora camptodes Turner, 1919
 Amelora catacris Meyrick, 1892
 Amelora ceraunia Turner, 1947
 Amelora conia Turner, 1947
 Amelora crenulata Turner, 1926
 Amelora cryphia Turner, 1919
 Amelora crypsigramma Lower, 1899
 Amelora demistis Guest, 1887
 Amelora fucosa Turner, 1919
 Amelora goniota Guest, 1887
 Amelora gonosemela (Lower, 1893)
 Amelora idiomorpha Lower, 1893
 Amelora leucaniata (Guenée, 1857)
 Amelora lithopepla Lower, 1918
 Amelora macarta Turner, 1919
 Amelora mesocapna Turner, 1919
 Amelora milvaria (Guenée, 1857)
 Amelora newmannaria (Guenée, 1857)
 Amelora oenobreches Turner, 1919
 Amelora oncerodes Turner, 1919
 Amelora oritropha Turner, 1919
 Amelora pachyspila Turner, 1919
 Amelora pentheres Turner, 1919
 Amelora perinipha (Lower, 1915)
 Amelora petrochroa (Lower, 1897)
 Amelora polychroa Lower, 1907
 Amelora sparsularia (Guenée, 1857)
 Amelora suffusa Turner, 1926
 Amelora synclera Turner, 1919
 Amelora syscia (Turner, 1919)
 Amelora thegalea Turner, 1947
 Amelora zophopasta Turner, 1919

References
 Amelora at Markku Savela's Lepidoptera and some other life forms

Nacophorini
Geometridae genera